"Today I'm Gonna Try and Change the World" is a song co-written and recorded by Canadian country music artist Johnny Reid. It was released in June 2010 as the first single from his 2010 album A Place Called Love. The song reached No. 41 on the Canadian Hot 100 in July 2010.

The song was nominated for best single and best songwriting at the 2011 Canadian Country Music Association Awards.

Music video
The music video was directed by Margaret Malandruccolo and premiered in July 2010. It was named CMT music video of the year at the 2011 Canadian Country Music Association Awards.

Chart performance

References

2010 singles
Johnny Reid songs
EMI Records singles
Songs written by Brent Maher
Song recordings produced by Brent Maher
2010 songs
Music videos directed by Margaret Malandruccolo
Canadian Country Music Association Video of the Year videos
Songs written by Johnny Reid